John Montgomery Ward, pitcher for the Providence Grays, pitched a perfect game against the Buffalo Bisons by retiring all 27 batters he faced on Thursday, June 17, 1880. This event took place in the Messer Street Grounds in Providence, Rhode Island.

Background
This was the second game of a three game series involving the Grays and the Bisons.
Providence, defending National League pennant champions, was 13–11 (with two ties) prior to the game, which was good for 4th place in the league, 8.5 games back of the Chicago White Stockings. Ward pitched a majority of the games for the season, appearing in 70 total games for the season. They were winners of four straight games coming into this game.  As for Buffalo, they were 8–17 and 7th in the league, 14 games behind Chicago, with only the Cincinnati Reds having a worse record. They had lost two straight games going into this match-up.  The home team was determined by a coinflip, which Buffalo won.

The game
The Bisons committed seven errors, with the most being two from right fielder (and later catcher) Bill Crowley and pitcher Pud Galvin, with Crowley having a passed ball and Galvin throwing a wild pitch. This is one of six perfect games in which both pitchers pitched the full nine innings. This was the second perfect game in history. This was the last perfect game in the National League until Jim Bunning threw one in 1964, which was the same year that Ward was elected to the National Baseball Hall of Fame and Museum by the Veterans Committee.

Game statistics
June 17, Messer Street Grounds, Providence, Rhode Island

Box score

References

1880 Major League Baseball season
Major League Baseball perfect games
Providence Grays
Buffalo Bisons (NL)
June 1880 sports events
1880 in sports in Rhode Island
History of Providence, Rhode Island
Sports competitions in Rhode Island